The Jing Guang Centre (an abbreviation for "Beijing-Guangzhou Centre") is a  skyscraper in Beijing CBD which was top of the List of tallest buildings in Beijing from 1989 to 2006.

The Jing Guang Centre was also the tallest building in mainland China from completion in 1989 until 1996, when King Tower in Shanghai and Shenzhen's Shun Hing Square were completed. The main tower is composed of 3 parts: hotel, offices and condominium, with a side building of additional office space on the northern side.

Rosewood Beijing Hotel
The hotel section of the centre was originally the Jing Guang New World Hotel Beijing. The hotel was closed and refurbished in 2012–2013 to become the Rosewood Beijing Hotel. As of 2018 Rosewood Beijing was still owned by listed company New World Development, but managed by private company Rosewood Hotel Group. Rosewood Hotel Group owns both Rosewood Hotels & Resorts and New World brands.

Another New World Beijing Hotel was opened in Wangfujing, on 8 Qinian Street, Chongwenmen, Dongcheng District.

References

External links
Jing Guang Office Building website
Rosewood Beijing official website

Skyscraper office buildings in Beijing
World Trade Centers
Buildings and structures in Chaoyang District, Beijing
Contemporary Chinese architecture
Residential skyscrapers in China
Skyscraper hotels in Beijing